The Blue Grotto is a  sea cave on the coast of the island of Capri, southern Italy. Sunlight passing through an underwater cavity and shining through the seawater creates a blue reflection that illuminates the cavern.

Access 
The cave is 60 metres long and 25 metres wide. The entry is two metres wide and roughly one metre high at low tide, making safe access possible only when tides are low and the sea is calm. To enter the grotto, visitors must lie flat on the bottom of a small four-person rowboat. The oarsman then uses a metal chain attached to the cave walls to guide the boat inside the grotto. 

In 2011 a visitor suffered a life altering injury when his neck was broken while entering the cave. The Cooperativa Battellieri Grotta Azzurra initially denied liability but settled a damages claim. It was concluded that the boatmen had continued entering the cave when the sea conditions were inappropriate. Swimming in the grotto is forbidden.

Colour 

The Blue Grotto is one of several sea caves worldwide that is flooded with a brilliant blue or emerald light. The quality and nature of the colour in each is determined by its unique combination of depth, breadth, water clarity, and light source.

In the case of the Blue Grotto, the light comes from two sources: the narrow arched entranceway, and an aperture approximately ten times as large directly below it, separated by a band of rock between one and two meters tall.  Because it is farther from the surface much less light passes through the lower opening, but its depth and size allow it to be the grotto water's primary source of illumination.

As light passes through the water into the cave, red reflections are filtered out and only blue light enters the cave. Objects placed in the water of the grotto famously appear silver. This is caused by tiny bubbles, which cover the outside of the object when they are placed underwater. The bubbles cause the light to refract differently than it does from the surrounding water and gives off the silver effect.

In part because of the dazzling effect of the light from the above-water opening, it is impossible for a visitor who is in one of the rowboats to identify the shape of the larger hole, the outline of the bar that separates the two holes, or the nature of the light source, other than a general awareness that the light is coming up from underneath, and that the water in the cave is more light-filled than the air. A visitor who places a hand in the water can see it "glow" eerily in this light.

History
During Roman times, the grotto was used as the personal swimming hole of Emperor Tiberius as well as a marine temple. Tiberius moved from the Roman capital to the island of Capri in 27 AD. During Tiberius' reign, the grotto was decorated with several statues as well as resting areas around the edge of the cave. Three statues of the Roman sea gods Neptune and Triton were recovered from the floor of the grotto in 1964 and are now on display at a museum in Anacapri. Seven bases of statues were also recovered from the grotto floor in 2009. This suggests that there are at least four more statues lying on the cave's bottom. The cave was described by the Roman historian Pliny the Elder as being populated with Triton "playing on a shell". The now missing arms on the recovered Triton statue – usually depicted with a conch shell, suggest that the statues recovered in 1964 are the same statues Pliny the Elder saw in the 1st century AD. According to a reconstruction of how the Blue Grotto may have looked in Roman times, a swarm of Triton statues headed by a Neptune statue may have stood in the walls of the cave. The Marevivo association aims construct this by placing statues in the grotto. This project is being carried out in collaboration with the archaeological superintendence of Pompeii.

At the back of the main cave of the Blue Grotto, three connecting passageways lead to the Sala dei Nomi, or "Room of Names", named for the graffiti signatures left by visitors over the centuries. Two more passages lead deeper into the cliffs on the side of island. It was thought that these passages were ancient stairways that led to Emperor Tiberius' palace. However, the passages are natural ones that narrow and then end further along.

During the 18th century, the grotto was known to the locals as Gradola, after the nearby landing place of Gradola. It was avoided by sailors and islanders because it was said to be inhabited by witches and monsters. The grotto was then "rediscovered" by the public in 1826, with the visit of German writer August Kopisch and his friend Ernst Fries, who were taken to the grotto by local fisherman Angelo Ferraro.

The legend of the blue Grotto
The cave as in every medieval history was said to be a refuge for devils and monsters. Two priests determined to drive them away entered the cave swimming, after a few minutes spent inside it they ran away in panic as if they had seen the face of the devil. From that moment on, the two began to rant. Named the cursed cave, it preserves numerous legends.

Cultural influence
In 1826, German writer August Kopisch and his friend Ernst Fries, a German painter, visited the cave and recorded their visit in the Kopisch's Entdeckung der blauen Grotte auf der Insel Capri in 1838.

In 1842 Danish choreographer August Bournonville set the second act of his ballet Napoli in the Blue Grotto. In this fantastic tale, Golfo, the demon who rules the Blue Grotto, transforms the ballet's heroine, Teresina, into a Naiad.

Mark Twain visited the Blue Grotto in 1869 and recorded his thoughts in his book The Innocents Abroad.

Uranian poet Edwin Emmanuel Bradford recorded his impression of a bathing boy in the Blue Grotto in the poem "In Quest of Love", included in In Quest of Love and Other Poems (1914), and again in "The Bather in the Blue Grotto at Capri", included in The New Chivalry and Other Poems (1918) and reprinted in To Boys Unknown (1988). Both poems were anthologised in Lad's Love: An anthology of Uranian poetry and prose (2010).

The grotto is highlighted in the 1953 Newbery Honor book Red Sails to Capri by Ann Weil.  

In Alberto Moravia's 1954 novel Il disprezzo (Contempt), a vision appears to the protagonist when, under heavy mental stress, he visits the cave alone.

See also
 List of caves
 List of caves in Italy
 Modra špilja on island of Biševo, Croatia
 Blue Grotto, a group of sea caverns on the south coast of Malta

References

External links

 Grotta Azzurra
 The Virtual Cave: Seacaves

Sea caves
Caves of Campania
Grottoes
Capri, Campania
Tourist attractions in Campania